The women's 400 metres at the 2006 European Athletics Championships were held at the Ullevi on 8, 9 and 10 August.

Medalists

Schedule

Results

Round 1
Qualification: First 3 in each heat (Q) and the next 4 fastest (q) advance to the semifinals.

Semifinals
First 4 of each Semifinal will be directly qualified (Q) for the Final.

Semifinal 1

Semifinal 2

Final

External links
 Results

400
400 metres at the European Athletics Championships
2006 in women's athletics